Castilla elastica, the Panama rubber tree, is a tree native to the tropical areas of Mexico, Central America, and northern South America. It was the principal source of latex among the Mesoamerican peoples in pre-Columbian times. The latex gathered from Castilla elastica was converted into usable rubber by mixing the latex with the juice of the morning glory species Ipomoea alba which, conveniently, is typically found in the wild as a vine climbing Castilla elastica. The rubber produced by this method found several uses, including most notably, the manufacture of balls for the Mesoamerican ballgame ōllamaliztli.

The Nahuatl word for rubber was ulli / olli, from which their word for the ballgame derived), and also their name for the ancient people they associated with the origin of the ballgame, the Olmecs (olmeca: "rubber people"). The Nahuatl word for the tree of Castilla elastica is olicuáhuitl; in Spanish it is known as palo de hule.

Subspecies
Castilla elastica ssp. costaricana (Liebm.) C.C.Berg
Castilla elastica ssp. elastica

Vernacular names 
Caucho, castilloa rubber.

See also
Guayule - another source of latex utilized by the pre-Columbian Mesoamericans
Para rubber tree - the main source of modern commercial natural latex

References

External links 

   
  

Moraceae
Plants described in 1794
Rubber
Natural history of Mesoamerica
Crops originating from Mexico
Trees of Chiapas
Trees of Colombia
Trees of Central America
Trees of Ecuador
Trees of Veracruz